The Draperstown Railway was an Irish gauge in County Londonderry, Northern Ireland.

History

The line was built between 1881 and 1883, a short single-track branch line  in length, to connect Magherafelt and Draperstown. The engineer was John Lanyon, and the contractors were J & W Grainger.

It was operated by the Belfast and Northern Counties Railway and taken over by them in July 1895.

Passenger services were withdrawn in 1930 and the line was finally closed in 1950.

Stations

The following stations were on the route:
Magherafelt
Desertmartin
Draperstown

References

Closed railways in Northern Ireland
Transport in County Londonderry
Railway lines opened in 1883
Railway lines closed in 1950
Defunct railway companies of Ireland
Irish gauge railways